Salut Victor is a Canadian film, released in 1989. Based on Edward O. Phillips's short story "Matthew and Chauncy", the film was directed by Anne Claire Poirier and written by Poirier and Marthe Blackburn.

The film stars Jean-Louis Roux as Philippe and Jacques Godin as Victor, two older men living in a retirement home who fall in love; prior to moving into the home, Victor was openly gay while Philippe was in the closet about his own repressed homosexuality.

The film was produced for the National Film Board.

Cast
 Jean Besré	
 Muriel Dutil
 Jacques Godin as Victor Laprade		
 Juliette Huot	
 Marthe Nadeau
 Huguette Oligny	
 Jean-Louis Roux as Philippe Lanctot 
 Julie Vincent

See also 
 List of LGBT films directed by women

References

External links 
 

1989 films
Canadian drama films
Canadian LGBT-related films
LGBT-related drama films
1989 LGBT-related films
Films directed by Anne Claire Poirier
National Film Board of Canada films
Films based on short fiction
Films about old age
French-language Canadian films
1980s Canadian films